San Jose Diridon station is the central passenger rail depot for San Jose, California. It also serves as a major intermodal transit center for Santa Clara County and Silicon Valley. The station is named after former Santa Clara County Supervisor Rod Diridon.

The station is on the Union Pacific Coast Line tracks (formerly Southern Pacific) at 65 Cahill Street in San Jose. The depot is listed on the National Register of Historic Places for its Italian Renaissance Revival style architectural and historical significance.

The station is served by Caltrain, ACE, VTA light rail, and Amtrak trains. The bus plaza at the station is served by Amtrak Thruway Motorcoach, Greyhound, Megabus, Monterey-Salinas Transit, Santa Cruz Metro (Highway 17 Express), and VTA buses.

Bay Area Rapid Transit (BART) metro service to a new underground station is projected to begin in 2029–2030 with the completion of the Silicon Valley BART extension.

Architecture

The depot is in the Italian Renaissance Revival style, with a three-story central section flanked by two-story wings. The building, a compilation of rectangular sections, is 390 feet (118 m) long and 40 feet to 78 feet (12 to 24 m) wide. The central section, which contains the passenger waiting room, measures 40 by 80 feet (12 by 25 m) and is 33 feet (10 m) high. The high center pavilion housing the waiting room is constructed of steel columns and trusses. The side wings are framed with wood. The exterior walls are clad with tapestry brick or varied colors and arranged in an English bond pattern. The depot is in an industrial area formerly dominated by warehouses and related commercial businesses. Several vernacular sheds, a water tower, butterfly passenger sheds and the nearby Alameda underpass are all contributing buildings and structures within the railroad station.

The building was designed by Southern Pacific architect, John H. Christie, who had worked on the Southern Pacific remodeling of the Fresno depot in 1915 and later, in 1939, worked on Union Station in Los Angeles. This depot is one of only four Italian Renaissance Revival style depots in California, and the largest surviving depot of the San Francisco–San Jose line. The only other large depot built in California during the 1930s was the Los Angeles Union Passenger Terminal.

History

A rail station at this location was established in 1878, when the narrow-gauge South Pacific Coast Railroad opened their San Jose Depot on the site. When Southern Pacific gained control of the railroad in 1887, the station was folded into the system and referred to as the West San Jose Depot.

The current station opened in December 1935 as Cahill Depot. The opening of the depot was the culmination of a 30-year effort to relocate  of the Coast Line of the Southern Pacific Railroad away from the heavy traffic of the downtown area around the Market Street Depot, formerly located at Market and Bassett Streets, to the eastern edge of Willow Glen. The new depot replaced the Fourth Street line's station for passengers, though freight operations persisted for some time at the old facility.

The Cahill Depot was a stop for several Southern Pacific passenger trains, including the famous San Francisco–Los Angeles train, the Coast Daylight. Other "named" trains that used the station were the all first-class Lark (a San Francisco-Los Angeles night train), seasonal Suntan Special, and the Del Monte. It was also a major station on the Peninsula Commute, the SP's commuter service between San Jose and San Francisco.

Amtrak took over long-distance passenger train service in 1971. Fourteen years later, Caltrans took over the Peninsula Commute and renamed it Caltrain.

Restoration of the station was finished in 1994, when the station was renamed Diridon Station after former Santa Clara County Supervisor Rod Diridon.

In 1996, Santa Clara County voters approved a half cent sales tax to fund the 1996 Measure B Transportation Improvement Project. Part of this project was the construction of the Vasona Light Rail extension which included a VTA light rail platform at the Diridon train depot. The official opening date for this light rail extension was October 1, 2005, however, revenue service at the San Fernando and Diridon Stations began on July 29, 2005 to accommodate attendees of the inaugural San Jose Grand Prix race.

The passenger platform was featured in the opening scene of Alfred Hitchcock's Marnie (1964) representing the Hartford, Connecticut, train station.

Services

Rail
Diridon Station is a major station for the Caltrain commuter rail line. Most trains outside of peak hours originate and terminate here, with rush-hour trains continuing as far south as Gilroy. It is the southern terminus for the Altamont Corridor Express, a commuter service running between Stockton and Silicon Valley.

The station is the southern terminus for the Capitol Corridor, Amtrak's regional rail service for the urban core of Northern California, with seven round trips to Sacramento on weekdays and six on weekends. A seventh weekend round trip goes all the way to Auburn in the foothills of the Sierra Nevada. It is also a major stop for Amtrak's Coast Starlight, a long-distance service running along the length of the Pacific Coast from Seattle to Los Angeles.

Diridon Station is served by the Green Line of the VTA Light Rail system.

Bus
 Amtrak Thruway
 Greyhound
 Megabus
 Santa Cruz Metropolitan Transit District: Highway 17 Express

Future
The San Jose Diridon station is planned as a future stop on the California High-Speed Rail line and Phase II of VTA's Silicon Valley BART extension in Santa Clara County. Since late 2019, CHSRA, VTA, Caltrain, and City of San Jose have jointly held "Diridon Integrated Station Concept Plan" public workshops to determine how to best rebuild the Diridon station in order to facilitate integration of future and existing services.

The BART station will be called Diridon and planned to be a subway station adjacent to the train station and Santa Clara Street. It will be located between the Santa Clara and Downtown San Jose BART stations with direct service to Santa Clara, San Francisco/Daly City (via the East Bay), and Richmond.

References

External links

Caltrain – San Jose Diridon Station
Stations – ACE
Diridon Station – VTA

Railway stations in San Jose, California
Caltrain stations in Santa Clara County, California
Amtrak stations in Santa Clara County, California
Santa Clara Valley Transportation Authority light rail stations
Santa Clara Valley Transportation Authority bus stations
Former Southern Pacific Railroad stations in California
Altamont Corridor Express stations in Santa Clara County, California
Proposed public transportation in the San Francisco Bay Area
National Register of Historic Places in Santa Clara County, California
Railway stations in the United States opened in 1935
Railway stations on the National Register of Historic Places in California
Transit centers in the United States
Italian Renaissance Revival architecture in the United States
Renaissance Revival architecture in California
Proposed California High-Speed Rail stations
Future Bay Area Rapid Transit stations